Dianne L'Ami (born 24 April 1976) is a New Zealand former basketball player who competed in the 2000 Summer Olympics.

References

1976 births
Living people
New Zealand women's basketball players
Olympic basketball players of New Zealand
Basketball players at the 2000 Summer Olympics